Jagadish Shivappa Shettar (born 17 December 1955) is an Indian politician belonging to Bharatiya Janata Party (BJP), who served as the 15th Chief Minister of Karnataka from 2012 to 2013. He has subsequently served as Leader of the Opposition in the Karnataka Legislative Assembly. Earlier, he was the Speaker of the Karnataka Legislative Assembly during 2008–2009. Currently he represents Hubli-Dharwad Central Vidhan Sabha seat. On 20 August 2019 he was inducted as the Cabinet Minister for Large and medium scale industries excluding sugar and Public Enterprise department in the BJP Government led by B.S. Yediyurappa. As the cabinet was being dissolved after the resignation of B. S. Yediyurappa, he also further announced he won't be part of any cabinet in the future.

Early life
Shettar was born on 17 December 1955 in Kerur village of Badami Taluk in Bagalkote district (formerly Bijapur district), Karnataka. His father is Sri. S.S. Shettar and his mother is Smt. Basavenamma. His father, S.S. Shettar, a senior activist of the Jana Sangh, was elected five times to the Hubli-Dharwad Municipal Corporation and became the first Jana Sangh Mayor of Hubli-Dharwad. His uncle Sadashiv Shettar was the first Jana Sangh leader in South India to get elected to the Karnataka Legislative Assembly. He was elected from Hubli City in 1967. Shettar holds BCom and LLB degrees and was a practicing lawyer for 20 years at the Hubli Bar. He married Smt. Shilpa and the couple have 2 sons - Prashant and Sankalp. He belongs to banajiga sub-sect of Lingayat community.

Political career
In 2008, following the BJP victory in Karnataka assembly elections, Shettar was unanimously elected as the Speaker of the Karnataka legislative assembly. However, he resigned from this post in 2009 and was inducted into the cabinet of B.S. Yeddyurappa as Minister for Rural development and Panchayat Raj.

In July 2012, several BJP MLAs owing allegiance to B.S. Yeddyurappa called for the replacement of D.V. Sadananda Gowda with Shettar. After much turmoil, the BJP High Command agreed to make him the Chief minister. He was sworn in on 12 July 2012.

2013 Assembly elections
Ahead of assembly polls which were held in May 2013, BJP declared Shettar as its Chief Ministerial candidate for Karnataka state.

Shettar resigned as Chief Minister as BJP failed to retain its power. He submitted his resignation to the Governor of Karnataka on 8 May 2013. BJP suffered a big loss in the May 2013 assembly elections as the Congress wrested Karnataka.

Post elections
Jagdish Shettar was elected as the leader of BJP's legislative party and Leader of opposition in Karnataka Legislative Assembly.

See also

References

External links
 

1955 births
20th-century Indian lawyers
Bharatiya Janata Party politicians from Karnataka
Chief ministers from Bharatiya Janata Party
Chief Ministers of Karnataka
Karnataka MLAs 2008–2013
Karnataka MLAs 2018–2023
leaders of the Opposition in the Karnataka Legislative Assembly
living people
people from Bagalkot
people from Hubli
speakers of the Karnataka Legislative Assembly
state cabinet ministers of Karnataka